Isometroides vescus, also known as the spider-hunting scorpion or spiral burrow scorpion, is a species of scorpion in the Buthidae family. It is native to Australia, and was first described by German arachnologist Ferdinand Karsch in 1880.

Description
The species grows to about 50 mm in length. It is mainly golden-brown in colour, with a dark brown tail tip.

Distribution and habitat
Found across much of inland Australia, except for the far north, the species occurs in sclerophyll forests and woodlands, as well as saltbush plains.

Behaviour
The scorpions are specialised free-ranging nocturnal predators of trapdoor spiders, and are often found in the vacant burrows of their prey.

References

 

 
vescus
Scorpions of Australia
Endemic fauna of Australia
Fauna of New South Wales
Fauna of the Northern Territory
Fauna of Queensland
Fauna of South Australia
Fauna of Victoria (Australia)
Fauna of Western Australia
Animals described in 1880
Taxa named by Ferdinand Karsch